Frontenac County is a county and census division of the Canadian province of Ontario.  It is located in the eastern portion of Southern Ontario. The city of Kingston is in the Frontenac census division, but is separated from the County of Frontenac.

Historical evolution
The county of Frontenac, situated within the Mecklenburg District, was originally created as an electoral district for the Legislative Assembly of Upper Canada in 1792 and its original limits were described as being:

Mecklenburg was renamed as the "Midland District" in 1792.

At the beginning of 1800, the County was reorganized as follows:

 the eastern part of the islands of the county of Ontario were transferred to Frontenac, on the former's dissolution
 Frontenac was declared to consist solely of the townships of Pittsburg, Kingston, Loughborough, Portland, Hinchbrooke, Bedford and Wolfe Island
 the remaining unorganized territory remained part of Midland District

Through the addition of newly surveyed townships, by 1845 the County covered the following territory:

In 1860, the newly surveyed townships of Miller and Canonto were transferred from Renfrew County

In 1998, the County was reorganized, and it now consists of the townships of North Frontenac, Central Frontenac, South Frontenac and  Frontenac Islands. The City of Kingston absorbed Kingston and Pittsburgh Townships and exists now as a separated municipality.

The county council itself was abolished and replaced by a management unit with limited powers, known as the Frontenac Management Board. The management unit became a county again in 2004.

Education 

Children attend schools part of the Limestone District School Board, based in the City of Kingston.

Demographics

Historic populations for Frontenac census division:
 Population in 2001: 138,606
 Population in 1996: 136,365

See also 
 List of municipalities in Ontario
 List of Ontario Census Divisions
 Kingston Frontenac Public Library
 K&P Rail Trail
 List of townships in Ontario

References 

 Rollaston, Brian, ed.  County of a Thousand Lakes: The History of the County of Frontenac.  Kingston: County of Frontenac, 1982.
 Ross, Alec & John De Visser. Kingston and Frontenac County. Erin ON: Boston Mills Press, 2009.
 Meacham, J.H.  Illustrated Historical Atlas of Frontenac, Lennox, and Addington Counties.  Toronto, 1878; reprint ed., Belleville: Mika, 1971.

External links 

 
Counties in Ontario